Yunnan firebelly toad may refer to two different species of toads:

 Bombina maxima, found in Yunnan, China, and likely Myanmar
 Bombina microdeladigitora, found in south-western China to north-western Vietnam, eastern Myanmar, and likely Laos